Turbinellus flabellatus is a species of fungus in the family Gomphaceae.  To date, this species has only been recorded from Japan.

References

External links
 
 

 Fungi of Asia 
 Gomphaceae